Thackerville is a town in Love County, Oklahoma, United States. It is located near the Texas state border. The population was 445 at the 2010 census.

Geography
Thackerville is located at  (33.795874, -97.143677). It is situated near the intersection of U.S. Highway 77 and State Highway 153, five miles north of the Texas state line and ten miles south of Marietta in south central Love County. Interstate 35 passes through town, putting Thackerville on the main route between Oklahoma City and Dallas/Ft. Worth.

History
Thackerville was founded in the mid-19th century. The community is named after Zacariah Thacker, a pioneer from Arkansas. It is believed that he was headed for the Amarillo, Texas area, but he camped one night at Wolf Hollow Creek in Indian Territory and remained there until his death a few years later. Thacker befriended some of the local Indians and together they farmed a very productive corn crop. Before long, many people began settling in the area.

After Thacker's death in 1887, the community relocated from its original site near where Wolf Creek enters the Red River, to its present location. The main reason behind the move was to be closer to the Atchison, Topeka, and Santa Fe Railway. A depot was constructed and the first grocery store, built by Oce McCage, opened across from it. Soon after, a school, churches, and a post office were constructed. Thackerville had a dirt main street with board walks that connected store porches.

Court records filed in the United States Court, Southern District, in Indian Territory at Ardmore indicate that citizens of the community petitioned to incorporate Thackerville under Arkansas law on October 15, 1898. At that time, approximately 175 people lived in the community. On July 5, 1899, Thackerville was officially incorporated into Indian Territory by Judge Hosea Townsend.

At the time of its founding, Thackerville was located in Pickens County, Chickasaw Nation.

U.S. Highway 77 was established from the Red River through Thackerville in 1926. At that time, the town moved to each side of the highway, which became the new "main" street in the community. Thackerville's population fluctuated throughout the remainder of the 20th century, reaching a low of 178 in 1950 and peaking at 431 in 1980.

Thackerville is the location of the WinStar World Casino, operated by the Chickasaw Nation.

Demographics

Thackerville is part of the Ardmore, Oklahoma Micropolitan Statistical Area.

At the 2000 census there were 404 people, 149 households, and 108 families living in the town. The racial makeup of the town was 89.85% White, 4.70% Native American, 0.25% Asian, 0.99% from other races, and 4.21% from two or more races. Hispanic or Latino of any race were 2.97%.

Of the 149 households 34.9% had children under the age of 18 living with them, 57.7% were married couples living together, 8.7% had a female householder with no husband present, and 27.5% were non-families. 23.5% of households were one person and 9.4% were one person aged 65 or older. The average household size was 2.71 and the average family size was 3.18.

The age distribution was 29.2% under the age of 18, 7.2% from 18 to 24, 26.5% from 25 to 44, 26.2% from 45 to 64, and 10.9% 65 or older. The median age was 37 years. For every 100 females, there were 117.2 males. For every 100 females age 18 and over, there were 110.3 males.

The median household income was $22,750 and the median family income was $45,893. Males had a median income of $29,375 versus $18,611 for females. The per capita income for the town was $19,605. About 7.7% of families and 13.5% of the population were below the poverty line, including 10.9% of those under age 18 and 22.2% of those age 65 or over.

Education
Thackerville Public Schools, a PK-12 school district, serves the town of Thackerville as well as unincorporated areas in south central Love County.

In popular culture
Terry Bradshaw, four-time Super Bowl champion, maintains a ranch in Thackerville which is the home location for his reality TV show, The Bradshaw Bunch.

References

External links
 Thackerville Oklahoma Information

Towns in Love County, Oklahoma
Towns in Oklahoma
Ardmore, Oklahoma micropolitan area